Erich Ussat (born 31 May 1907, date of death unknown) was a German racing cyclist. He rode in the 1931 Tour de France.

References

External links
 

1907 births
Year of death missing
German male cyclists
Sportspeople from Hanover
Cyclists from Lower Saxony